Renaud III (d. 1141), son of John I, Count of Soissons, and Aveline de Pierrefonds.  Count of Soissons.

Little is known about Renaud other than he inherited the Count of Soissons from his father in 1115. Upon Renaud's death in 1141, Ivo II de Nesle was chosen as his successor by the Bishop of Soisson, Joscelin de Vierzi.

Renaud married Bathilde, of an unknown family, in 1137.  No children are recorded.  Renaud was the last of the Norman counts of Soissons.

Notes

Sources 

Counts of Soissons
Year of birth missing
1141 deaths